= Burrilanka =

- Village
- Interactive map of Burrilanka
- Location in Andhra Pradesh, India Burrilanka (India)
- Coordinates: 16.897324°N 81.802029°E
- Country: India
- State: Andhra Pradesh
- Region: Visakhapatnam
- District: East Godavari district

Languages
  - Official: Telugu
- Time zone: UTC+5:30 (IST)
- PIN: 533126

Burrilanka is situated in part of great Rajamahendravaram in Andhra Pradesh State.
